Dighi Union is union parishad under Manikganj Sadar Upazila of Manikganj District, Bangladesh.

Geography

Demographics
According to the 2011 Bangladesh census, Dighi Union had 4,629 households and a population of 20,094.

Economy
There are total 4 Haats and Bazars. Besides 8 fairs (Mela) are held in Dighi Union. Tara Bazar, Dautia Bazar, BoT Tola Bazar(Bangla) are famous bazar in Dighi Union.

Administration
Dighi Union has 26 rural,
The Rural are - Muljan, Vatbaour, Dighi, Bagzan, Romonpur, Gulotia, Susunda, Dayotia, khagrakuri, Rohadoho, Kutai, Chamta, Notun bosti, Bot-tola
29 Mauzas/Mahallas, and 36 villages.

Road
National Highway 5
Dhaka-Bangladesh Highway.
N5 (Bangladesh)

River
Kaliganga River

Institution
Dighi Union has 2 College, 3 Secondary School, 7 Primary School, 1 Bank, 1 Union Health Center, 1 Protibondhi institute, 1 Electricity Institute, 1 Bus Station.

Education
Among the educational institutions.

Higher secondary educational institutions
 Manikganj Medical College 
 Garpara Hafiz Uddin Degree College.

Secondary educational institution
 Muljan High School, Manikganj
 Government Textile Vocational Institute Manikganj 
 Dautia Garpara Rahima Hafij High School.

References

Populated places in Dhaka Division
Unions of Manikganj Sadar Upazila